The 2018 Manitoba Scotties Tournament of Hearts, the provincial women's curling championship of Manitoba, was held from January 10 to 14 at the Shamrock Centre in Killarney. The winning Jennifer Jones team represented Manitoba at the 2018 Scotties Tournament of Hearts in Penticton, British Columbia.

Qualification Process

Top 5 Seeds

1. Jones

2. Einarson

3. Robertson

4. Birchard

5.  Meilleur

Teams
The teams are listed as follows:

Round-robin standings

Scores

January 10
Draw 1
Briscoe 9-8 Watling 
Birchard 7-6 Brown
Jones 9-2 Hale-Menard  
Calvert 10-5 Meilleur

Draw 2
Clark-Rouire 6-7 Lamb
Robertson 12-6 McLean
Zacharias 3-9 Einarson
Reed 1-8 Spencer

Draw 3
Jones 5-9 Brown
Watling 8-5 Calvert
Meilleur 10-3 Briscoe
Birchard 4-10 Hale-Menard

Draw 4
Einarson 7-4 McLean
Clark-Rouire 7-4 Reed
Spencer 9-5 Lamb
Robertson 8-2 Zacharias

January 11
Draw 5
Birchard 9-3 Calvert
Meilleur 9-2 Hale-Menard
Watling 8-10 Brown
Jones 11-6 Briscoe

Draw 6
Robertson 8-1 Reed
Spencer 7-5 Zacharias
Clark-Rouire 8-3 McLean
Einarson 10-1 Lamb

Draw 7
Watling 11-3 Hale-Menard
Jones 8-4 Calvert
Birchard 8-1 Briscoe
Meilleur 4-5 Brown

Draw 8
Clark-Rouire 3-8 Zacharias
Einarson 7-4 Reed
Robertson 11-6 Lamb
Spencer 10-3 McLean

January 12
Draw 9
Robertson 6-5 Spencer
McLean 8-6 Lamb
Reed 4-8 Zacharias
Einarson 9-1 Clark-Rouire

Draw 10
Birchard 6-10 Meilleur
Brown 7-4 Briscoe
Calvert 9-4 Hale-Menard
Jones 8-4 Watling

Draw 11
McLean 4-7 Zacharias
Spencer 3-9 Clark-Rouire
Einarson 7-4 Robertson
Reed 5-10 Lamb

Draw 12
Brown 7-3 Hale-Menard
Meilleur 5-11 Watling
Jones 12-0 Birchard
Calvert 4-9 Briscoe

January 13
Draw 13
Einarson 7-5 Spencer
Zacharias 8-5 Lamb
Reed 7-3 McLean
Robertson 7-4 Clark-Rouire

Draw 14
Jones 9-4 Meilleur
Hale-Menard 7-6 Briscoe
Calvert 7-4 Brown
Birchard 7-11 Watling

Playoffs

R1 vs B1
Saturday, January 13, 8:00

R2 vs B2
Saturday, January 13, 8:00pm

Semifinal
Sunday, January 14, 9:30 am

Final
Sunday, January 14, 3:30 pm

References

2018 Scotties Tournament of Hearts
Scotties Tournament of Hearts
Municipality of Killarney-Turtle Mountain
January 2018 sports events in Canada